Rivula biagi is a moth of the family Erebidae first described by George Thomas Bethune-Baker in 1908. It is known from New Guinea and the Australian state of Queensland.

References

"Species Rivula biagi Bethune-Baker, 1908". Australian Faunal Directory. Archived 9 October 2012.

Moths of Australia
Hypeninae
Moths described in 1908